Leila J. Rupp (born 1950) is a historian, feminist, and professor of Feminist Studies at the University of California, Santa Barbara. She is an alumna of Bryn Mawr College, a member of the Seven Sisters women's colleges, where she received her bachelor's degree in 1972 as well as Ph.D. in 1976, both in history.  Her areas of interest include women's movements, sexuality, and LGBT and women's history.

She was the editor of the Journal of Women's History from 1996 to 2004.

An out lesbian, her partner is Verta Taylor, with whom she coauthored several works.

Publications 
Leila J. Rupp: Transnational Women's Movements, European History Online, Mainz: Institute of European History, 2011, retrieved: June 22, 2011.
Leila J. Rupp, Sapphistries: A Global History of Love Between Women (New York: New York University Press, 2009).
Leila J. Rupp and Verta Taylor, Drag Queens at the 801 Cabaret (Chicago: University of Chicago Press, 2003). xiii, 256 p. : ill. ; 24 cm. 
Leila J. Rupp, A Desired Past: A Short History of Same-Sex Love in America (Chicago: University of Chicago Press, 1999, paperback 2002).
Vytou_ená minulost [Czech translation, by Vera Sokolová] (Prague: One Woman Press, 2001).
Leila J. Rupp, Worlds of Women: The Making of an International Women's Movement (Princeton: Princeton University Press, 1997).
Leila J. Rupp and Verta Taylor, Survival in the Doldrums: The American Women's Rights Movement, 1945 to the 1960s (New York: Oxford University Press, 1987; Columbus: Ohio State University Press [paperback edition], 1990).
Excerpt reprinted in Perspectives on the American Past (Lexington, MA: D.C. Heath, forthcoming).
Leila J. Rupp, Mobilizing Women for War: German and American Propaganda, 1939-1945 (Princeton: Princeton University Press, 1978).

References 

21st-century American historians
American feminists
1950 births
Living people
University of California, Santa Barbara faculty
Bryn Mawr College alumni
Feminist studies scholars
American lesbian writers
American women historians
Lambda Literary Award winners
21st-century American women writers
Historians of LGBT topics
American historians
Lesbian academics